Dimitrios Aslanidis is a Greek weightlifter. He won one silver and one bronze medal for Greece, at the 2018 Mediterranean Games.

References

Greek athletes
Living people
1992 births
Mediterranean Games medalists in weightlifting
Mediterranean Games silver medalists for Greece
Mediterranean Games bronze medalists for Greece
Competitors at the 2018 Mediterranean Games